Joseph Maritim (born 22 October 1968) is a retired Kenyan athlete who specialized in the 400 metres hurdles.

He finished fourth at the 1987 All-Africa Games, in a career best time of 49.33 seconds.

He also competed at the 1988 Olympic Games without reaching the final.

References

External links

1968 births
Living people
Kenyan male hurdlers
Athletes (track and field) at the 1988 Summer Olympics
Athletes (track and field) at the 1990 Commonwealth Games
Olympic athletes of Kenya
Commonwealth Games competitors for Kenya
Athletes (track and field) at the 1987 All-Africa Games
African Games competitors for Kenya